Gary Michael Berman is an American businessperson. He is the founder of the Entertainment Development Group and ARE Retail Entertainment.

Business career

Early career
Berman began his career as an accountant with Ernst & Young. He also served as the Vice President for International Operations and Planning for a division of Warner Bros, and as an executive for real estate mogul John Gandel. In the mid-1990s, Berman served as Managing Director of Village Nine Leisure, a producer of indoor entertainment complexes called "intertainment sites".

Retail management
In 1996 Berman quit the company and became the founder of Entertainment Development Group (EDG), which was the parent company for firms including King Pin Bowling, Bar Code, The Next Blue a nightclub in Melbourne's Crown Casino, Galactic Circus, and M9 Laser Wars. The group's first major client was Sega, which signed $50 million in contracts with Berman's new company in 1996 in order for them to open Sega retail stores in the Australian and pan-Asian area, which helped EDG secure more than $150 million in contracts during its first year to open and managed retail stores in the region. Over its first year the company made a profit of $1 million and in its second year its profit increased to $5 million. Berman also negotiated the rights for Blockbuster Australia and New Zealand. In 2005 Berman sold his stake in the company to Macquarie Leisure Trust for $10.8 million. In 2006 Berman moved the Barcode outside of the casino and opened a location in New Delhi, India.

In 2006 Berman also acquired the exclusive rights to distribute Ed Hardy (clothing line) and its associated labels in Australia, under the company name Ed Hardy Operations. Berman opened 14 retail stores in the country and signed sublicensing agreements in other Australasian countries. By 2009 the company was ranked the sixth fastest growing company in Australia by the Business Review Weekly. The company folded in 2010.

References

External links
 ARE Retail Entertainment

Australian chief executives
Living people
Australian company founders
Nightclub owners
Year of birth missing (living people)